Nabeel Sabah Zghaiyer Al-Helechi (born July 1, 1990 in Baghdad, Iraq), is an Iraqi footballer who plays as a winger or full-back and sometimes as an attacking midfielder for Amanat Baghdad in Iraqi Premier League.

International debut
In November 14, 2012 Nabeel Sabah made his International debut against Jordan in the 2014 FIFA World Cup qualification, which was ended 1-0 win for Iraq.

Honours

Club
Erbil SC
2011–12 Iraqi Premier League winner
2012 AFC Cup runners-up
Al-Shorta
2019 Iraqi Super Cup winner

International
Iraq National football team
 2012 WAFF Championship: runner-up
 21st Arabian Gulf Cup: runner-up

External links

Profile on Goalzz

1990 births
Living people
Association football midfielders
Erbil SC players
People from Baghdad
Iraqi footballers
Al-Shorta SC players
Iraq international footballers